Virbia orola is a moth in the family Erebidae. It was described by Harrison Gray Dyar Jr. in 1914. It is found in Panama.

References

Arctiidae genus list at Butterflies and Moths of the World of the Natural History Museum

Moths described in 1914
orola
Arctiinae of South America